Heteropentalenes are class of heterocyclic compound. Heteropentalenes have one, two or more heteroatoms on the ring. It consists of two pentagonal rings. Heteropentalenes with 10 pi electrons show aromaticity. Some of heteropentalenes are mesomeric betaines. However those heteropentalenes are not mesoionic

See also 
Benzimidazole
Diazapentalene
Indole
Mesomeric betaine
Trithiapentalene

References

Heterocyclic compounds with 2 rings
Simple aromatic rings